The 2012 Aysén protests were a series of protests that occurred in Aysén Region in central Chilean Patagonia in February 2012.

Protests
The protests were organized by Movimiento Social por Aysén (Social Movement for Aysén), a leftist organization grouping together 20 other organization including Workers' United Center of Chile, ANEF and Patagonia Sin Represas and local fishermen.  The protests centered on demands for subsidies from the national government, even though Aysén already receives a disproportionately high (per capita) level of national subsidies and expenditures for the region.  Many of the demands were considered to be contrary to the existing constitution of the country. The protests paralysed air, land, and water transport not only within the region but also into and out of the central Patagonia region, effectively trapping thousands of tourists.   Protesters also damaged a Chilean government air ambulance that was being used to evacuate injured people.  The protests resulted in hundreds of injuries and several millions of dollars in damage to local industry, personal and commercial property, and public infrastructure. Towards the end of the protests, the national government invoked the national internal security law, which is intended to deal with acts of terrorism against the country.

Demands
Demands included:
Lowering of prices for gas, petroleum, parafin/kerosene, LP gas and wood (subsidies) 
Improvements to the healthcare infrastructure of the region 
Regional adjustments to the minimum wage
The creation of a University based in Aysén Region 
Regionalization of water, agropecuarian and mining resources (contrary to Chilean constitutional law) 
Increased rights and benefits for fishermen
Regional adjustments in pensions for seniors and the handicapped

There were also support protests for Aysén by leftist organisations in other Chilean cities like Arica, Viña del Mar, Talca, Concepción and Ancud.

See also
HidroAysén
2011–2012 Chilean student protests
2011 Magallanes protests
 List of protests in the 21st century
Eye injury in the 2019–2020 Chilean protests

References

Protests in Chile
Aysen protests
Aysen
Aysen
Aysen protests, 2011
History of Aysén Region
Social history of Chile